Noctueliopsis is a genus of moths of the family Crambidae.

Species
Noctueliopsis aridalis (Barnes & Benjamin, 1922)
Noctueliopsis atascaderalis (Munroe, 1951)
Noctueliopsis australis (Dognin, 1910)
Noctueliopsis brunnealis Munroe, 1972
Noctueliopsis bububattalis (Hulst, 1886)
Noctueliopsis decolorata Munroe, 1974
Noctueliopsis grandis Munroe, 1974
Noctueliopsis palmalis (Barnes & McDunnough, 1918)
Noctueliopsis pandoralis (Barnes & McDunnough, 1914)
Noctueliopsis puertalis (Barnes & McDunnough, 1912)
Noctueliopsis rhodoxanthinalis Munroe, 1974
Noctueliopsis virula (Barnes & McDunnough, 1918)

References

Natural History Museum Lepidoptera genus database

Odontiini
Crambidae genera
Taxa named by Eugene G. Munroe